Dark Matter is the debut solo studio album by British jazz musician Moses Boyd. Boyd released it independently on 14 February 2020 under his own label, Exodus Records. The album was his third-ever solo project, following Absolute Zero (2017) and Displaced Diaspora (2018). Dark Matter was met with widespread critical acclaim upon release and was later nominated for the Mercury Prize.

Background and recording
Boyd explained to Apple Music that the record "isn’t meant to be a negative record; it's meant to unify, to make people think.” On the inspiration and motive behind the record's title, he told The Fader:

Composition 

Musically, Dark Matter is a jazz record with elements of electronica, dance, jazz fusion, grime, and rock. Piotr Orlov of Afropunk additionally highlighted the record's influences of afro-pop and afrobeats. Elizabeth Aubrey of NME described the record as a "melting-pot of genres and styles where complex jazz rhythms sit alongside [the aforementioned genres]", stressing that "whilst its head leans towards the mathematical with its polymath rhythms and intricate structures, its heart is firmly on the dancefloor." Bryan Hahn of The Fader confirmed that on the album, Boyd "ignored expectations and rules, blending genres, freshly recorded sounds, and emotions."

Release and promotion 
Despite releasing the album's lead single "Stranger Than Fiction" on 23 October 2019, Boyd only announced the album with the release of the second single, "Only You" on 27 November 2019. The album's third and final single, "Shades of You" was released on 9 January 2020.

Critical reception

Dark Matter received positive acclaim from music critics. At Metacritic, which assigns a normalized rating out of 100 to reviews from professional publications, the album received an average score of 83, based on 11 reviews. Album of the Year collected 12 reviews and calculated an average of 79 out of 100. Aggregator AnyDecentMusic? gave it 7.8 out of 10, based on their assessment of the critical consensus.

Elizabeth Aubrey of NME described Dark Matter as "an ambitious work full of scope, where Boyd continues to innovate and impress." Andy Cowan of Mojo described the album as a "vivid, diverse debut", and described Boyd as "ridiculously gifted". John Lewis of Uncut wrote, "This is not pastiche or revival — this is jazz created in a distinctly London accent; the sounds you hear in cars and minicabs, the fractured beats you hear pouring out of teenagers’ phones — refracted through the prism of jazz." Dhruva Balram of DJ Mag wrote that Dark Matter possesses a "jazz-kissed effect", while noting that Boyd blends in elements of reggae, dub, dancehall, drum and bass, techno, house and garage "remarkably well". He concluded, "Deftly, it sounds like an ode to the various genres that the UK can claim and champion." Crack Magazine wrote "Producer albums can often be noodly, navel-gazing affairs… this isn’t one of those." Liam Martin of AllMusic concluded that Dark Matter "cements [Boyd] as one of the most exciting jazz musicians of his generation."

Accolades

Rankings

Awards

Track listing

Personnel
Credits adapted from Discogs and the album's liner notes:

Instrumentation and production

 Moses Boyd – producer , drums , drum programming , songwriter 
 Nathaniel Cross – arrangement , trombone , songwriter 
 Joe Armon-Jones – keyboards , synthesizer , rhodes , songwriter 
 Michael Underwood – tenor saxophone , flute 
 Ife Ogunjobe – trumpet 
 Theon Cross – tuba 
 Artie Zaitz – guitar 
 Koyejo Oloko – executive producer 
 Nubya Garcia – tenor saxophone 
 Phillip Harper – percussion 
 Binker Golding – tenor saxophone 
 Poppy Ajudha – vocals, songwriter 
 Arnaud Gichaud – alto saxophone 
 Chelsea Carmichael – baritone saxophone 
 Steven Umoh – vocals, songwriter 
 Nonku Phiri – vocals, songwriter 
 Klein – vocals 
 Gary Crosby – vocals

Technical and design

 Caspar Sutton-Jones – mastering engineer
 David Wehinm – mixing engineer, audio engineer
 Ahmad Dayes – recording engineer
* David Dargahi – recording engineer
 David Rodger – recording endineer
 Gilles Barrett – recording engineer
 Jay Thomas Heigl – recording engineer
 Mia Bradley – recording engineer
 Stella Murphy – designer
 Metropolis Studios – mastering location

Charts

See also
List of UK Independent Album Breakers Chart number ones of the 2020s

References

2020 debut albums
Jazz albums by English artists
Jazz fusion albums by English artists